The 1987 Five Nations Championship was the fifty-eighth series of the rugby union Five Nations Championship. Including the previous incarnations as the Home Nations and Five Nations, this was the ninety-third series of the northern hemisphere rugby union championship. Ten matches were played over five weekends between 7 February and 4 April. This was the last time the championship would be interrupted by weather conditions until the Six Nations of 2012. France won with a Grand Slam, for the fourth time, while England won the Calcutta Cup, in their only win.

Participants
The teams involved were:

Table

Squads

Results

References

External links
1987 Five Nations Championship Data

Six Nations Championship seasons
Five Nations
Five Nations
Five Nations
Five Nations
Five Nations
Five Nations
 Five Nations
Five Nations
Five Nations
Five Nations